Heleioporus is a genus of frogs native to Australia. Of the six species in this genus, five live in south-west Western Australia, while the other one species only occurs in south-eastern Australia. All members of this genus are medium to large sized burrowing frogs with rounded heads, short bodies, bulging eyes, short limbs and the hands are free from webbing. The toes are relatively short with only a trace of fleshy webbing. A characteristic of this genus (except for Heleioporus eyrei and some Heleioporus psammophilus) is the black nuptial spines that male frogs have on their first and occasionally second and third fingers. The pupil restrict to form a vertical slit and the tympanum is usually distinct. All the species in this genus call from burrows where the eggs are later deposited in a foam mass. Embryos develop in this mass until hatching. Hatching occurs after the burrows are flooded with water, and may be delayed until this happens. The calls of these species are similar although differ in frequency, length, note and repetition rate.

Species

References

 Barker, J. Grigg, G.C. Tyler, M.J. 1995. A Field Guide to Australian Frogs. Surrey Beatty & Sons 

 
Taxa named by John Edward Gray
Amphibian genera